Aa Gale Lag Jaa is a 1973 Hindi romantic film directed by Manmohan Desai, based on a story by Smt. Jeevanprabha Desai. It stars Shashi Kapoor, Sharmila Tagore and Shatrughan Sinha. The film became a box office hit.

Poornima received a Filmfare nomination as Best Female Playback Singer for the song "Tera Mujhse Hai." Her nomination is the only Filmfare nomination for the film. Aa Gale Lag Jaa is noted for its wonderful hit songs which had music by R.D. Burman with lyrics by Sahir Ludhianvi.

The film was remade in Telugu as Manchi Manushulu, in Tamil as Uthaman and in Persian as Ranande-ye-ejbari. The Sinhalese movie Yali Hamuwennai directed by Sena Samarasinghe in the 1980s is said to be a direct copy of this film. The 1977 Pakistani movie Aina and the 1985 Hindi movie Pyar Jhukta Nahin were also inspired by this movie.

Plot
Preeti is a young medico living in Mumbai along with her widower father, Heerachand. On a holiday to Simla, she meets a young man Prem, an amateur skater. He teases her initially but later falls for her. After some wooing, Preeti also reciprocates his feelings. During a trip to the hills, Preeti meets with an accident and loses consciousness. To save her from hypothermia, he gets close with her and one thing leads to another and become intimate.

Immediately after, Prem tells her that he got close only to save her and proposes to her. She gladly accepts and directs him to her father. Her father, Heerachand doesn't want her daughter to marry him and offers him money to leave her. Prem doesn't agree and leaves a letter for Preeti at her hospital explaining everything and asking her to come with him. But Heerachand meddles with the letter and rewrites it as if Prem was asking money to marry her. Preeti becomes surprised and decides to forget him and leaves for Bombay.

There, she gets engaged with Dr. Amar, her long-term friend and admirer. He leaves for Germany for higher studies and then Preeti learns of her pregnancy. Her father wants to abort the child, but she doesn't agree, at last, they decide to go to Khandala to give birth. She goes there and unbeknownst to her, Prem stays there along with his mother. Preeti gives birth to a healthy boy there. Knowing that Prem requests to take the child for himself. Heerachand agrees and gives him the child. Preeti is told that the baby was stillborn. She mourns and returns to Bombay.

Prem comes to Bombay along with his son and starts a career as a skating teacher. His son Rahul can't walk due to a polio attack. After years, Prem again meets Preeti in a function. She thinks that Prem got married and had a son. In that function, Amar announces that he wouldn't marry till he makes Rahul walk. He starts treating Rahul and meanwhile Preeti grows attached to Rahul without knowing that he is her son. She tries to talk to Prem, who then knows the truth that Heerachand changed his letter. But he keeps mum for the sake of Amar.

Amar learns the truth about Preeti and Prem and becomes troubled. He succeeds in making Rahul walk though. Prem gets mortally injured while saving Tikki (Amar's sister) from goons. He gives Rahul his wallet before going for surgery saying that his mother's photo is in there. Preeti sees it and questions her father about her child. He confesses that he hid the truth from her and Rahul was her son. Amar saves Prem and everybody reconciles. Preeti and Prem marry and stay happy with their son.

Cast

Soundtrack 
The songs of this movie were composed by legendary music composer Rahul Dev Burman and the lyrics were penned by Sahir Ludhianvi. The songs of this movie are popular till today, especially "Vaada Karo" and "Tera Mujhse Hai Pehle Ka Nata Koi" are remembered till this day. The song "Vaada Karo" is an adaptation of Song for my Father by Horace Silver.
 01.   "Vaada Karo"... Kishore Kumar and Lata Mangeshkar
 02.   "Na Koi Dil Mein Samaya"... Kishore Kumar
 03.   "Tera Mujhse Hain Pehle Ka Nata Koi" (Duet)... Kishore Kumar and Sushma Shrestha
 04.   "Tera Mujhse Hain Pehle Ka Nata Koi" (Male)... Kishore Kumar
 05.   "Aye Mere Bete" (Happy)... Kishore Kumar and Sushma Shrestha
 06.   "Aye Mere Bete" (Sad)... Kishore Kumar

In popular culture

Cult Status in Algeria 
The film has enjoyed an unusual cult status in Algeria since its release. The cult following remains four decades since the film's release. The movie there is called JANITOU.

References

External links
 

1973 films
1970s Hindi-language films
1973 romantic drama films
Films set in Himachal Pradesh
Films scored by R. D. Burman
Hindi films remade in other languages
Films directed by Manmohan Desai
Hindi-language romance films
Indian romantic drama films